Sadhu Ram Chand Murmu University, also known as Jhargram University, is a public state university in Jhargram, Jhargram district, West Bengal. The university was established in 2018 as Jhargram University under The Jhargram University Act, 2017. In 2021, it was renamed as Sadhu Ram Chand Murmu University. It became active with the appointment of the first vice-chancellor, Amiya Kumar Panda, in 2021.

See also
 List of universities in West Bengal
 Education in India
 Education in West Bengal
 Sadhu Ramchand Murmu

References

External links
https://wbhed.gov.in/readwrite/uploads/THE_JHARGRAM_UNIVERSITY_ACT_2017.pdf

Universities and colleges in Jhargram district
Universities and colleges in West Bengal
Educational institutions established in 2021
Jhargram district
2021 establishments in West Bengal